Bobby Green may refer to:

Bobby Joe Green (1936–1993), National Football League punter and running back
Bobby Green (fighter) (born 1986), mixed martial artist

See also
 Bob Green (disambiguation)
Robert Green (disambiguation)